Balmoral is an unincorporated community in Restigouche County, New Brunswick, Canada. It held village status prior to 2023. It is approximately 10 kilometres south of Dalhousie. Balmoral also contains the neighbourhoods of Blair Athol, Saint-Maure, Selwood, and Upper Balmoral.

History

The area was settled in the 1850s by Joseph Drapeau. When a later contingent of settlers from Scotland arrived, they gave the community its present name after Balmoral Castle.

On 1 January 2023, Balmoral amalgamated with the neighbouring village of Eel River Crossing and all or part of five local service districts to form the new village of Bois-Joli. The community's name remains in official use.

Demographics 

Population trend

Language
Mother tongue (2016)

Economy
Forestry is the most important industry in the village.

Notable people

See also
List of communities in New Brunswick

References

External links
 Village of Balmoral

Communities in Restigouche County, New Brunswick
Former villages in New Brunswick
Local service districts of Restigouche County, New Brunswick